Evita Regža (born October 26, 1982 in Riga) is a Latvian female curler.

At the national level, she is a nine-time Latvian women's champion (2002, 2003, 2006, 2007, 2010, 2011, 2013, 2014, 2015), a 2011 mixed champion and a 2013 mixed doubles champion.

Teams

Women's

Mixed

Mixed doubles

Personal life
She is from family of known Latvian curlers: her father Ansis and mother Dace are curlers and curling coaches. Her younger sister Anete Zābere (née Regža) also is a curler.

References

External links

 Skip Cottage Curling: Here come the girls
Video: 

Living people
1988 births
Latvian female curlers
Latvian curling champions
Place of birth missing (living people)
21st-century Latvian women